The Taiwan spurdog (Squalus formosus) is a species of shark in the genus Squalus. It was accidentally found in Taiwan's Tashi fish market by William Toby White and a colleague of the CSIRO in Hobart, Australia. They named it S. formosus ("Formosa" being a former name for Taiwan). It has also be recorded from the coast of Japan, near Kyushu and Shikoku.

Sharks now identified as Squalus formosus had earlier been classified as Squalus blainville, a species that is no longer considered to occur in Taiwan. Squalus formosus can be morphologically separated from other three Squalus species found in Taiwanese waters (which are S. brevirostris, S. japonicus and S. mitsukurii); it is morphologically more similar to Squalus albifrons from eastern Australia than the other Taiwanese species. Similarly, genetic methods identify S. albifrons as the closest relative of S. formosus.

It is a medium-sized species of Squalus that can reach at least  TL.

References

Squalus
Fish of Japan
Fish of Taiwan
Fish of the Pacific Ocean
Fish described in 2011
Taxa named by William Toby White